Talen is a town in Madhya Pradesh, India.

Geography
It has an average elevation of 428 metres (1,404 feet).

Demographics
 India census, Talen had a population of 9,098. Males constitute 52% of the population and females 48%. Talen has an average literacy rate of 56%, lower than the national average of 59.5%: male literacy is 61%, and female literacy is 35%. In Talen, 20% of the population is under 6 years of age.

Transport
The town has bus services only during the day time. Nearest railway station is Shujalpur at 21 km (on Indore-Bhopal track) another one is pachore (17 km). The nearest airport is in Bhopal which is 84 km (by train) and 115 km (by bus)

References

Cities and towns in Rajgarh district
Rajgarh, Madhya Pradesh